Bekirli may refer to:
 
 Bekirli, Biga, a village in Biga district of Çanakkale Province, Turkey
 Bekirli, Çivril
 Bekirli, Karaisalı, a village in Karaisalı district, Adana Province, Turkey
 Bekirli, Perşembe, a village in Perşembe district of Ordu Province, Turkey
 Bekirli, Taşköprü, a village